Yorkton is a provincial electoral district for the Legislative Assembly of Saskatchewan, Canada. It has historically almost always voted for the governing party, selecting an opposition candidate only twice in its history (1938 & 1960).

The current boundaries of the constituency were set by the Representation Act, 2012 (Saskatchewan).

Founded as "York City" in 1882, Yorkton (pop. 15,038) became a city on February 1, 1928.

Members of the Legislative Assembly

Election results (1991–present)

|-

 
|NDP
|Chad Blenkin
|align="right"|1,932
|align="right"|25.70
|align="right"|-11.82

|- bgcolor="white"
!align="left" colspan=3|Total
!align="right"|7,517
!align="right"|100.00
!align="right"|

|-

 
|NDP
|Randy Goulden
|align="right"|3,158
|align="right"|37.52
|align="right"|-14.01

|- bgcolor="white"
!align="left" colspan=3|Total
!align="right"|8,417
!align="right"|100.00
!align="right"|

|-
 
| style="width: 130px" |NDP
|Clay Serby
|align="right"|3,993
|align="right"|51.53
|align="right"|+10.54

|- bgcolor="white"
!align="left" colspan=3|Total
!align="right"|7,749
!align="right"|100.00
!align="right"|

|-
 
| style="width: 130px" |NDP
|Clay Serby
|align="right"|2,893
|align="right"|40.99
|align="right"|-8.58

|- bgcolor="white"
!align="left" colspan=3|Total
!align="right"|7,058
!align="right"|100.00
!align="right"|

|-
 
| style="width: 130px" |NDP
|Clay Serby
|align="right"|3,588
|align="right"|49.57
|align="right"|-9.41

 
|Prog. Conservative
|Howard W. Evans
|align="right"|860
|align="right"|11.88
|align="right"|-10.35
|- bgcolor="white"
!align="left" colspan=3|Total
!align="right"|7,239
!align="right"|100.00
!align="right"|

|-
 
| style="width: 130px" |NDP
|Clay Serby
|align="right"|4,897
|align="right"|58.98
|align="right"|–
 
|Prog. Conservative
|Brian Fromm
|align="right"|1,846
|align="right"|22.23
|align="right"|–

|- bgcolor="white"
!align="left" colspan=3|Total
!align="right"|8,303
!align="right"|100.00
!align="right"|

History

Members of the Legislative Assembly

See also
Yorkton – North-West Territories territorial electoral district
Yorkton – Federal electoral district

References

External links 
Website of the Legislative Assembly of Saskatchewan
Saskatchewan Archives Board – Saskatchewan Election Results By Electoral Division

Saskatchewan provincial electoral districts
Yorkton